Albert Victor Edward Allen (7 May 1887 – 4 June 1975) was an Australian rules football player and umpire. He played for Richmond in the Victorian Football League (VFL).  For a short period he was appointed to the VFL list of umpires.

Football career

Allen was recruited to Richmond from Preston and made his debut in round 3 versus University. Named at full-forward he snapped the match's first goal and scored another later but the Tigers were defeated by 15 points. The following week Allen played in his second and final VFL match. He kicked one goal and Richmond lost again this time by 26 points.

Richmond made four changes the following week including Allen who  did not play for Richmond again.

Umpiring career

In 1915 Allen was briefly appointed to the VFL list of boundary umpires. He made his VFL debut in round 7 earning Heritage Number 100 when he officiated in the South Melbourne versus Melbourne match. He umpired his last VFL match, Carlton versus Richmond the following week.

References

External links

Richmond Football Club players
Australian Football League umpires
Preston Football Club (VFA) players
Australian rules footballers from Melbourne
1887 births
1975 deaths
People from Fitzroy, Victoria